Monster Trux: Arenas is a video game for the Wii console. It was created by Data Design Interactive, a budget developer. The Wii Wheel is compatible with the game. On PlayStation 2 a Special Edition was released. The game uses the same coverart as Monster Trux Extreme (Arena Edition) released on 25. March 2005 on the Playstation 2 made also by Data Design and published by Phoenix Games.

Use of real monster trucks 
Some of the trucks in the game are based on real trucks, such as Flame (based on WCW Nitro (truck)), Wrench (based on Wrenchead.com), and Doom (based on The Outsiders). Other trucks in the game include Pro (which is not a monster truck), Midknight, By 4, Crush, and Dumper.

Reception 
The game received overwhelmingly negative reviews. IGN gave it a 1.0 for bad graphics, presentation, sound and gameplay.

References

2007 video games
Monster truck video games
Racing video games
Video games developed in the United Kingdom
Wii games
Wii-only games
Data Design Interactive games
Conspiracy Entertainment games
Multiplayer and single-player video games